Joseph Alain Michaël Bournival (born May 31, 1992) is a Canadian former professional ice hockey player. He played for the Tampa Bay Lightning and the Montreal Canadiens of the National Hockey League (NHL). He was originally drafted by the Colorado Avalanche.

Playing career
As a youth, Bournival played in the 2005 Quebec International Pee-Wee Hockey Tournament with a minor ice hockey team from Mauricie.

Bournival was drafted 7th overall by the Shawinigan Cataractes in the 2008 QMJHL Entry Draft. After completing his second season with 62 points in 58 games, Bournival was selected by the Colorado Avalanche in the 3rd round (71st overall) of the 2010 NHL Entry Draft. On November 11, 2010, the Avalanche traded Bournival to the Montreal Canadiens in exchange for Ryan O'Byrne.

During his final season in 2011–12 as captain with the Shawinigan Cataractes, Bournival was signed to a three-year entry level contract with the Canadiens on December 21, 2011. In 2012, the Cataractes won their first Memorial Cup.

On October 17, 2013, Bournival scored his first NHL goal against the Columbus Blue Jackets in a 5-3 victory game at the Bell Centre in Montreal, Quebec.

At the conclusion of the 2015–16 season, having been unable to return to the NHL, Bournival was not tendered a qualifying offer by the Canadiens and was released to free agency. On July 1, 2016, Bournival was signed to a one-year, two-way contract with the Tampa Bay Lightning. On January 12, 2017, Bournival skated in his 100th career NHL game, which came in a 4-2 Lightning win over the Buffalo Sabres.

On July 14, 2017, Bournival signed a one-year, two-way contract extension with the Lightning. On April 19, 2018, Bournival signed a one-year extension with the Lightning.

On March 17, 2018, during a game against the Laval Rocket, Bournival tore his ACL. He required surgery, and missed the rest of the 2017–18 season. On April 19, 2018, Bournival signed a one-year extension with the Lightning. He had surgery soon after and missed the start of 2018–19 season.

Bournival returned to action on November 17, 2018, coincidentally against the Laval Rocket, eight months after his knee injury. Only thirteen days later, against the Cleveland Monsters, he sustained a shoulder injury which ended his season. He opted into surgery on his shoulder.

With injuries limiting Bournival to just 5 games with the Crunch and taking an toll on his health, Bournival opted to retire from professional hockey after 7 seasons on June 14, 2019.

International play

Bournival was selected and participated at the 2012 World Junior Ice Hockey Championships, helping Canada claim the bronze medal.

Career statistics

Regular season and playoffs

International

References

External links

1992 births
Living people
Canadian ice hockey left wingers
Colorado Avalanche draft picks
French Quebecers
Hamilton Bulldogs (AHL) players
Ice hockey people from Quebec
Montreal Canadiens players
Sportspeople from Shawinigan
St. John's IceCaps players
Shawinigan Cataractes players
Syracuse Crunch players
Tampa Bay Lightning players